The Girl from Flanders is a 1956 romantic drama film directed by Helmut Käutner starring Nicole Berger, Maximilian Schell, and Viktor de Kowa. It is an adaption of the novel Engele von Löwen (Angele de Louvain) written by Carl Zuckmayer.

It was shot at the Tempelhof Studios in Berlin with location filming around the town of Damme in Flanders. The film's sets were designed by the art directors Emil Hasler and Walter Kutz.

Plot
1914, German advance through Belgium: the young war volunteer Alexander 'Alex' Haller (Schell) is given water by an equally young Belgian woman (Berger). 
1917, Third Battle of Flanders: Alex, now a 2nd lieutenant, is tired about the propaganda at the Home Front, so he spends his furlough in the hinterland of the Western Front. 
While boarding in a brothel, he meets the young woman again. They fall in love. 
Late 1918, German retreat after the Armistice: Engele and Alex meet again only to be harassed by a Belgian mob. Shortly prior to be hanged by the mob, a group of passing Belgian soldiers, tired about killing, saves them. End of the tale.

Cast

References

External links

1956 romantic drama films
1950s war drama films
German romantic drama films
German war drama films
West German films
Films based on works by Carl Zuckmayer
Films directed by Helmut Käutner
German World War I films
Western Front (World War I) films
Films set in Belgium
Films shot in Belgium
Films shot at Tempelhof Studios
UFA GmbH films
1950s German films
1950s German-language films
German black-and-white films